Synchlora xysteraria is a moth of the family Geometridae first described by George Duryea Hulst in 1886. It is found in the US states of Georgia and Florida and on Cuba and Hispaniola.

The wingspan is about 19 mm.

The larvae possibly feed on Taraxacum officinale.

References

Moths described in 1886
Synchlorini